Convergence Ventures (formerly Convergence Accel) is an Indonesia-based venture capital firm. The firm invests primarily in early stage funding in the emerging markets and startups which build technology products and internet services with a primary focus on Indonesia. The firm was founded by Adrian Li and joined by Partner Donald Wihardja in November 2014. The company manages a US$25 million fund with LPs from Indonesia, China and the US. As of 2019, Convergence Ventures has officially merged with Agaeti Ventures to become AC Ventures.

History 
Convergence was founded by Adrian Li in 2014 in Lampung, Indonesia. The firm focuses on early stage companies primarily in digital media, digital commerce, O2O and enabling technologies and invests at Pre- Series A to Series B stage. Up to end of 2015 the fund had announced 9 investments in Indotrading, Female Daily Network, Qraved, MalesBanget (MBDC Media), Paktor, Adskom, YesBoss, MoneySmart and Ematic Solutions.

In November 2015, Convergence Ventures announced a strategic and financial partnership with Google.

Convergence Ventures was known for adopting a hands-on and localized approach to the startups it invested in including providing resource access to support scaling and establishing a network of experienced founders to advise their startups.

Areas of investment 

Convergence Ventures focuses on the following areas of investment:
 Consumer internet
 Financial technology
 Digital advertising
 Online Mmdia
 eCommerce
 Social networking and communication
 Software as a service (SaaS)

References

External links 
 Official website

Venture capital firms
Financial services companies established in 2014
Companies based in Jakarta
Indonesian companies established in 2014